Márkó is a village in Veszprém county, Hungary. There were 1,212 inhabitants in 2014.

External links 
 Street map (Hungarian)

Populated places in Veszprém County